Carl Sundquist (born November 24, 1961) is an American former cyclist. He competed at the 1988 Summer Olympics and the 1992 Summer Olympics.

References

External links

1961 births
Living people
American male cyclists
Olympic cyclists of the United States
Cyclists at the 1988 Summer Olympics
Cyclists at the 1992 Summer Olympics
Sportspeople from Indianapolis
Pan American Games medalists in cycling
Pan American Games gold medalists for the United States
Cyclists from Indiana
American track cyclists
Cyclists at the 1987 Pan American Games